Vamos (lit. Come on or Let's go; officially Vamos por una Guatemala Diferente) is a conservative political party in Guatemala.

History
The political party was founded and registered by the Supreme Electoral Tribunal in 2017. Its leader and general secretary is Alejandro Giammattei, a three-time presidential candidate. Giammattei declared that the political party would be his platform to run in the 2019 general election.

The party has been criticized by some as a result of some former military officers who were accused of war crimes joining the party.

Electoral history

Presidential elections

Congressional elections

References

External links

2017 establishments in Guatemala
Conservative parties in Guatemala
Political parties established in 2017